Pasierby  (German: Pasierby; 1939-1945: Waisenort) is a village in the administrative district of Gmina Pępowo, within Gostyń County, Greater Poland Voivodeship, in west-central Poland.

References

Pasierby